The 2012–13 Lamar Cardinals basketball team represented Lamar University during the 2012–13 NCAA Division I men's basketball season. The Cardinals, led by second year head coach Pat Knight, played their home games at the Montagne Center and were members of the Southland Conference. They finished the season 3–28, 1–17 in Southland play to finish in last place. A year after being Southland tournament champions and playing in the NCAA Tournament, the Cardinals failed to qualify for the 2013 Southland tournament.

Roster

Schedule

|-
!colspan=9 style="" | Exhibition

|-
!colspan=9 style="" | Regular season

References

Lamar Cardinals basketball seasons
Lamar
Lamar Cardinals basketball
Lamar Cardinals basketball